Kokdala or Cocodala is a city in northern Xinjiang, China, bordering Kazakhstan's Almaty Region to the west. Administratively, it is a county-level city under the direct administration of the regional government, though it is geographically located in the Ili Kazakh Autonomous Prefecture. On March 18, 2015, the city was created as the eighth city of the Xinjiang Production and Construction Corps. The city covers a land area of 980 square km and has a population of around 80,000.

References 

County-level divisions of Xinjiang
2015 establishments in China
Xinjiang Production and Construction Corps
Populated places in Xinjiang